Kaarlo Richard Heinonen (9 February 1878, Naantali – 26 February 1944) was a Finnish politician. He was a Member of the Parliament of Finland for the Social Democratic Party of Finland from 1919 to 1922. He was Minister of Defence from 1926 to 1927.

References

1878 births
1944 deaths
People from Naantali
People from Turku and Pori Province (Grand Duchy of Finland)
Social Democratic Party of Finland politicians
Ministers of Defence of Finland
Members of the Parliament of Finland (1919–22)